Homan is a surname with a variety of origins. As a Dutch surname it appears to have originated as an assimilation (fm->m) of Ho(o)fman, making it cognate to names like Hoffman and Van 't Hof, indicating either an occupational (court servant; steward; or farmer) or toponymic origin (man at the homestead, court or farm). The oldest attestation is in the 14th century in Drenthe. In North America, it may be an Americanized spelling of the German names Homann or Hohmann. Homan also exists since the 17th century in Ireland, while in England it may be a variant of Holman. Notable people with the surname include:

 Bálint Hóman (1885–1951), Hungarian historian, Minister of Religion and Education 1932–1942, and Nazi collaborator
 Bill Homan (1880–1963), Australian footballer 
 Conrad Homan (1840–1922), Union Army soldier during the American Civil War
 Cornelius Homan (1900–1979), English Conservative Party politician
 Darren Homan (born 1974), Irish footballer
 Dennis Homan (born 1946), American football player
 Ed Homan, American physician and Republican politician in Florida
 Frank A. Homan, (1875-1958), American politician, mayor of Fresno, California
 Gertrude Homan (1882–1951), American actress, screenwriter, film editor, and studio executive
 Jared Homan (born 1983), American basketball player
 Johannes Linthorst Homan (1903–1986), Dutch politician and diplomat
 Korie Homan (born 1986), Dutch wheelchair tennis player
 Luke Homan, (-2006), American college basketball player
 Mark Homan (born 1979/80), Canadian curler, brother of Rachel
 Paul Homan (1893–1969), American economist
 Rachel Homan (born 1989), Canadian curler, sister of Mark
 Ralph Homan (1928–2013), American (South Dakota) politician and businessman
 Ross Homan (born 1987), American football linebacker
 Thomas Homan (born 1961), American government official, acting director of US Immigration and Customs Enforcement (ICE)
 Two-Bits Homan (1898–1953), American football player
 William Homan (1771–1852), Irish baronet
Adopted as a given or middle name
Homan Potterton (born 1946), Irish art historian and writer 
Emma Homan Thayer (1842–1908), American botanical artist and author
Howard Homan Buffett (1903–1964), American businessman, investor, and politician, father of Warren Buffett
Joseph Homan Manley (1842–1905), American Republican Party official 
William Homan Thorpe (1902–1986), British zoologist, ethologist and ornithologist

Named after people
Homan Bay on the eastern coast of Victoria Island, Canada, named by Amundsen after a sponsor of his expedition, C.H.  Homan.
Homan station (CTA Green Line) and Homan Square, both on Homan Ave, Chicago, itself named after the building contractor Joseph Homan
Homansbyen, a neighborhood of Oslo named for the lawyer brothers Jacob (1816–1868) and Henrik Homan (1824–1900)

See also
Homann, German surname
Homans, surname

References

Americanized surnames
Dutch-language surnames

de:Homan
fr:Homan
nl:Homan
sv:Homan